Raufarhöfn Airport  is an airport serving Raufarhöfn, Iceland.

The Raufarhöfn non-directional beacon (Ident: RA) is located 2.8 nautical miles north-northwest of the airport.

See also
Transport in Iceland
List of airports in Iceland

References

 Google Earth

External links
 OurAirports - Raufarhöfn
 Raufarhöfn Airport
 OpenStreetMap - Raufarhöfn

Airports in Iceland